Puls is a pottage made from farro grains boiled in water, flavoured with salt. It was a staple dish in the cuisine of Ancient Rome.

The dish was considered the aboriginal food of the Ancient Romans, and played a role in archaic religious rituals.

The basic grain pottage could be elaborated with vegetables, meat, cheese, or herbs to produce dishes similar to polenta or risotto.

References

Roman cuisine
Historical foods
Ancient dishes
Society of ancient Rome